Shadi Hedayati (b 1985 in Bochum) is a German actor of Persian descent. She became known for her role as Zari in the Sat.1 production Die Schlikkerfrauen.

Early life
Hedayati's parents are from Iran. Between 2001 and 2009, she attended studied singing, dancing and acting.

Career 
She made her debut as a theatre actress in the 2008 play Der Messias. She was also a part of the cast in Antigone and Winnetou and the Crossbreed. Hedayati made her first appearance on TV in the German legal dramedy Danni Lowinski in 2010. She played the lead for the first time in an episode of the ZDF production Flemming.

Hedayati was cast as the main character Selma Hadschi in the RTL pilot Scarlet & Hadschi. She made her first appearance as a lead character in a television film in the 2014 Sat.1 movie Die Schlikkerfrauen taking on the role of Schlikker employee Zari. One year later, she played the lead in the comedy Die Udo Honig Story. In the Sat.1 crime series 23 Cases, Hedayati plays the main character Tara Schöll, a Federal Criminal Police officer, who thinks a convicted criminal is innocent. Although the production started in 2015, the series is yet to air.

Hedayati starred as counter-terrorism investigator Pinar in the pilot Hamdullah – Im Namen Allahs (Hamdullah – In the Name of Allah) in 2015.

Hedayati lives in Cologne.

Selected filmography
2010: Danni Lowinski (one episode)
2012: 
2012: Alarm für Cobra 11 – Die Autobahnpolizei (episode 17x05)
2012: Flemming (episode 3x06)
2014: Die Schlikkerfrauen
2014: Binny and the Ghost (episode 1x08)
2015: Die Udo Honig Story
2017: Stuttgart Homicide (episode 8x25)

References

External links
 

1985 births
Living people
German film actresses
German stage actresses